George Gear (November 1, 1822 – February 13, 1905) was an English-born merchant in Newfoundland.

He was born in Bridport, Dorset and came to St. John's around 1846. Gear established a tinsmith business there. The business grew to include the sale of imported goods such as hardware, stoves and plumbing supplies which were modified to suit local needs. Gear played an important role in the expansion of Newfoundland industry during this period. His son Henry took over the business around 1880.

He died in Tennessee at the age of 82.

References 

1822 births
1905 deaths
Businesspeople from Newfoundland and Labrador